"The Healing" is a song performed by American contemporary Christian music singers Blanca and Dante Bowe. The song was released on March 4, 2022, as the second single from Blanca's third studio album, The Heartbreak and the Healing (2022). "The Healing" impacted Christian radio in the United States on April 1, 2022. The song was written by Anton Göransson, Blanca Reyes, Dante Bowe, and Isabella Sjosstrand. Anton Göransson produced the song.

"The Healing" peaked at No. 9 on the US Hot Christian Songs chart.

Background
On March 4, 2022, Blanca and Dante Bowe released "The Healing" along with the music video for the song. The song also exclusively premiered on K-Love radio that same day. Blanca described the collaboration with Dante Bowe as a "full circle moment" for her, as Bowe's music as well as Maverick City's had walked her through the past season of her life. The song was inspired by Blanca's personal healing from an illness, the subsequent death of her parents and a divorce.

"The Healing" impacted Christian radio in the United States on April 1, 2022.

Composition

Accolades

Commercial performance
"The Healing" debuted at No. 28 on the US Christian Airplay chart dated March 12, 2022, being the highest ranking debut that week.

"The Healing" made its debut at No. 39 on the US Hot Christian Songs chart dated March 19, 2022. The song reached No. 10 on the Hot Christian Songs chart dated August 13, 2022, becoming the second top-ten hit single for both Blanca and Dante Bowe.

Music videos
The official music video for "The Healing" premiered on Blanca's YouTube channel on March 4, 2022. The official lyric video of the song was published by Blanca on YouTube on March 9, 2022.

Charts

Weekly charts

Year-end charts

Release history

References

External links
 

2022 singles
2022 songs
Dante Bowe songs
Songs written by Dante Bowe